Silvie Polášková (born 13 January 1998) is a Czech handball player for DHC Sokol Poruba and the Czech national team.

She represented the Czech Republic at the 2020 European Women's Handball Championship.

References

1998 births
Living people
Czech female handball players
Sportspeople from Brno
21st-century Czech women